Endecatomus is a genus of beetles, the sole member of the family Endecatomidae. There are at least four described species in Endecatomus. Endecatomidae was formerly treated as a subfamily of Ciidae or Bostrichidae. They are found in the Holarctic region. Adults and larvae feed on the fruiting bodies of bracket fungus, creating bored cavities as they do so.

Species
 Endecatomus dorsalis Mellié, 1848
 Endecatomus lanatus (Lesne, 1934)
 Endecatomus reticulatus (Herbst, 1793)
 Endecatomus rugosus (Randall, 1838)

References

Further reading

External links

 

Bostrichoidea
Articles created by Qbugbot